Melvin White may refer to:

 Melvin White (murderer) (1950–2005), convicted murderer
 Melvin White (American football) (born 1990), NFL player
 Slappy White (Melvin Edward White, 1921–1995), American comedian

See also
 Mel White, American clergyman and author